Liberty: A Journal of Anarchist Communism was a monthly anarcho-communist paper published in London from 1894 to 1896, mostly comprising political essays. The paper was edited and published by James Tochatti from his shop in Hammersmith, London, with help from regular contributor Louisa Sarah Bevington.

Tochatti launched the paper in January 1894 in response to the violent rhetoric being used in the newspaper Commonweal. Liberty was to be avowedly against political violence and "bombastic talk", with Tochatti arguing that it only served to alienate people from the anarchist cause. Occasional contributors to the paper included William Morris, Peter Kropotkin, Elisée Reclus, Louise Michel, George Bernard Shaw, Voltairine de Cleyre, and Errico Malatesta.

Liberty also published a series of pamphlets by, amongst others, Kropotkin, Malatesta, Morris, Reclus and Bevington.

The paper ceased publication in December 1896 citing Tochatti's poor health, though finances were likely a contributing factor.

References

External links 

 An online archive of each issue of Liberty via libcom.org

Newspapers published in London
Publications established in 1894
Publications disestablished in 1896
Anarchist periodicals published in the United Kingdom
Monthly newspapers